The third season of NCIS: New Orleans, an American police procedural drama television series, originally aired on CBS from September 20, 2016, through May 16, 2017. The season was produced by CBS Television Studios. NCIS: New Orleans showrunner Gary Glasberg died during production of the season.

Cast and characters

Main
 Scott Bakula as Dwayne Cassius Pride, NCIS Supervisory Special Agent (SSA) and Team Leader
 Lucas Black as Christopher LaSalle, NCIS Senior Field Agent, second in command
 Vanessa Ferlito as Tammy Gregorio, NCIS Special Agent and former FBI Agent
 Rob Kerkovich as Sebastian Lund, NCIS  Special Agent and Forensic Specialist
 Daryl "Chill" Mitchell as Patton Plame, NCIS Computer Specialist
 Shalita Grant as Sonja Percy, NCIS Junior Field Agent
 C. C. H. Pounder as Loretta Wade, Jefferson Parish Medical Examiner for NCIS

Recurring
 Steven Weber as Douglas Hamilton, Mayor of New Orleans (R)
 Christopher Meyer as Danny Malloy, Loretta's eldest foster son (C.J.'s brother)
 Dani Dare as C.J. Malloy, Loretta's younger foster son (Danny's brother)
 Derek Webster as FBI Executive Assistant Director Raymond Isler
 Maury Sterling as John Stone, Mayor Hamilton's chief of security
 Julian Acosta as Javier Garcia
 Chelsea Field as Rita Devereaux, New Orleans District Attorney and Reserve Commander in the U.S. Navy's JAG and Dwayne's girlfriend
 Cassidy Freeman as Eva Azarova
 Matt Servitto as Carl Estes, NOPD captain

Guests
 Tom Arnold as Elvis Bertrand
 Mario Lopez as Officer Hernandez
 Wendie Malick as Sylvia Lund, Sebastian Lund's mother
 Christine Woods as Bonnie Madigan, SAT Com Specialist
 Jim Beaver as Jackson Hauser, Rig Manager
 Mark Harmon as Leroy Jethro Gibbs, NCIS Senior Special Agent (SSA) assigned to Washington's Navy Yard (uncredited)
 Sean Murray as Timothy McGee, NCIS Special Agent in Washington D.C., second in command
 Wilmer Valderrama as Nicholas Torres, NCIS Special Agent in D.C.
 Ed Quinn as Ethan McKinley
 Carlos Gomez as Dan Sanchez, NCIS Deputy Director
 Jeremy Ratchford as Richard Marino
 PJ Morton as himself
 Maren Morris as herself
 Toni Trucks as  CGIS Agent Joan Swanson

Episodes

Production

Development
NCIS: New Orleans was renewed for a third season on March 25, 2016. The third season was the last season produced by the NCIS: New Orleans creator and showrunner Gary Glasberg before he died on September 28, 2016. This season featured a crossover with NCIS and NCIS: New Orleans with a two-part crossover episode. Scott Bakula, and Lucas Black appeared as Dwayne Pride, and Christopher LaSalle, in the fifteenth episode of the fourteenth season of NCIS episode titled "Pandora's Box (Part I)". In the second part Mark Harmon, Sean Murray, and Wilmer Valderrama appeared as Leroy Jethro Gibbs, Timothy McGee, and Nicholas Torres in this season episode titled "Pandora's Box, Part II" which aired on February 14, 2017. NCIS: New Orleans was renewed for a fourth season on March 23, 2017.

Casting
Zoe McLellan, who played Special Agent Meredith Brody, will not be returning for their season. and former CSI:NY star Vanessa Ferlito joins the cast as Special Agent Tammy Gregorio.

Broadcast
Season three of NCIS: New Orleans premiered on September 20, 2016.

Reception

Ratings

References

External links
 
 

03
2016 American television seasons
2017 American television seasons